Nitin Pandit (born 15 April 1975) is an Indian cricket umpire. He has stood in matches in the Ranji Trophy tournament.

References

External links
 

1975 births
Living people
Indian cricket umpires
Place of birth missing (living people)